Chemidor Qom Basketball Club is an Iranian professional basketball team based in Qom and was founded in 2009.  The team compete in the Iranian Super League. They play their home games at Shahid Heidarian Arena.

Franchise history 
Chemidor Qom BC started to play in the Tehran province basketball league in 2014 and they became champion and Qualified to Iran's division 2. In Iran's division 2 league they became champion and Qualified to Iranian Super League in 2015.

Tournament records

Iranian Super League 
 2015-2016 : 3rd place 
 2016-2017 : 5th place 
 2017-2018 : —
 2018-2019 : 1st place in west asia championship and 3rd place in Iranian Super League
 2019-2020 : —
 2020-2021 : 3rd place

Players

Current roster

Notable players

References

External links 
 
 page on Asia-Basket

Basketball teams in Iran
Basketball teams established in 2009
Sport in Qom
2009 establishments in Iran